ISO/IEC 8859-3:1999, Information technology — 8-bit single-byte coded graphic character sets — Part 3: Latin alphabet No. 3, is part of the ISO/IEC 8859 series of ASCII-based standard character encodings, first edition published in 1988. It is informally referred to as Latin-3 or South European. It was designed to cover Turkish, Maltese and Esperanto, though the introduction of ISO/IEC 8859-9 superseded it for Turkish. The encoding was popular for users of Esperanto, but fell out of use as application support for Unicode became more common.

ISO-8859-3 is the IANA preferred charset name for this standard when supplemented with the C0 and C1 control codes from ISO/IEC 6429. Microsoft has assigned code page 28593 a.k.a. Windows-28593 to ISO-8859-3 in Windows. IBM has assigned code page 913 (CCSID 913) to ISO 8859-3.

Codepage layout

Differences from ISO-8859-1 are shown with their Unicode code point below.

See also
 Mac OS Maltese/Esperanto encoding

References

ISO/IEC 8859
Computer-related introductions in 1988